For the American MLB player, see Alec Mills.

Alec Campbell Mills (born 24 February 2001), is an Australian professional footballer who plays as a defender for Brisbane Roar NPL. Mills hails from Wooragee in Victoria's north-east, playing for NPL side Murray United as a junior before being recruited by Melbourne City.

Club career

Melbourne City
Mills started playing in Melbourne City's youth selections with under-20s and reserve team including the Y-League squad for the 2019–20 Y-League season. On 3 February 2021, Mills made his debut in the A-League, against the Central Coast Mariners as a substitute replacing Florin Berenguer in a 3–2 loss.

Career statistics

Club

International

Notes

Honours

International
Australia U20
AFF U-19 Youth Championship: 2019

References

External links

2001 births
Living people
Australian soccer players
Association football defenders
Melbourne City FC players
National Premier Leagues players
A-League Men players